Wibbel the Tailor (German: Schneider Wibbel) is a 1920 German silent comedy film directed by Manfred Noa and starring Hermann Picha, Margarete Kupfer and Meinhart Maur. It is an adaptation of the 1913 play Wibbel the Tailor by Hans Müller-Schlösser. It was made by Eiko Film and shot at the Marienfelde Studios in Berlin. The film's art direction is by Karl Machus.

Cast
 Hermann Picha as Schneider Wibbel
 Margarete Kupfer as Wibbels Frau 
 Meinhart Maur as Gefängnisschliesser 
 Gustav Trautschold as Gehilfen
 Wilhelm Diegelmann   
 Christian Elfeld   
 Loo Hardy   
 Emil Stammer

References

Bibliography
 Usai, Paolo Cherchi. Before Caligari: German cinema, 1895-1920. University of Wisconsin Press, 1991.

External links

1920 films
1920s historical comedy films
German historical comedy films
Films of the Weimar Republic
German silent feature films
Films directed by Manfred Noa
German films based on plays
Films set in Düsseldorf
Films set in the 1810s
German black-and-white films
1920 comedy films
Silent historical comedy films
Films shot at Terra Studios
1920s German films
1920s German-language films